Alexander Jack,  (19 October 1805 – 27 June 1857) was a Scottish officer in the service of the East India Company in the Bengal Army. He was educated at King's College, Aberdeen. He was with the 30th Bengal Native Infantry at Aliwal, and acted as brigadier of the force sent against Kangra, in 1846, during the First Sikh War. He commanded his battalion in the Second Sikh War; was promoted colonel in 1854, and brigadier in 1857. He was treacherously shot and killed during the Cawnpore massacre in June 1857.

Origins 
Alexander Jack was a grandson of William Jack, the minister of Northmavine, Shetland. His father, the Rev. William Jack (died 9 February 1854) (M.D., Edinburgh), was sub-principal of University and King's colleges, Aberdeen, from 1800 to 1815, and principal from 1815 to 1854. Principal Jack married in 1794 Grace, daughter of Andrew Bolt of Lerwick, Shetland, by whom he had six children.

Alexander, one of four sons, was born in Old Machar, Aberdeen, on 19 October 1805, was a student in mathematics and philosophy at King's College, Aberdeen, in 1820–1822, and was remembered by a class-fellow who survived him as a tall, handsome, soldierly young man.

Career 
Jack obtained a Bengal cadetship in 1823, was appointed ensign in the 30th Bengal Native Infantry on 23 May 1824, and became lieutenant in the regiment on 30 August 1825, captain on 2 December 1832, and major and brevet-lieutenant-colonel on 19 June 1846.

First Sikh War 

Jack was present with his battalion at the Battle of Aliwal (medal), and acted as brigadier of the force sent against the town and fort of Kangra in the Punjab, when he received great credit for his extraordinary exertions in bringing up his 18-pounder guns, which he had been recommended to leave behind. The march was said 'to reflect everlasting credit on the Bengal artillery'. Some views of the place taken by Jack were published under the title Six Sketches of Kot-Kangra, drawn on the spot (London, 1847, fol.).

Second Sikh War 
Jack was in command of his battalion in the Second Sikh War, including the battles of Chillianwalla and Goojerat (medal and clasps and C.B.). He was promoted to lieutenant-colonel in the 34th Bengal Native infantry on 18 December 1851. He became colonel on 20 June 1854, and on 18 July 1856 was appointed brigadier at Cawnpore, the headquarters of Sir Hugh Wheeler's division of the Bengal Army.

Indian Mutiny 
On 7 June 1857 the mutiny broke out at Cawnpore. Wheeler maintained his position in an entrenched camp until 27 June, when an attempted evacuation was made in accordance with an arrangement entered into with Nana Sahib. After the troops had embarked in boats for Allahabad, the mutineers treacherously shot down Jack and all the Englishmen except four. During the previous defence of the lines a brother, Andrew William Thomas Jack, who was on a visit from Australia, had his leg shattered, and succumbed under amputation.

Honours 

  Companion of the Order of the Bath
  Sutlej Medal, with clasp for Aliwal
  Punjab Medal, with clasps for Chillianwalla and Goojerat

Six Views of Kot-Kangra

References

Sources 

 Buckle, E. (1852). Memoir of the Services of the Bengal Artillery from the Formation of the Corps to the Present Time. Kaye, J. W. (ed.). London: Wm. H. Allen. p. 520.
 
 Jack, Alexander (1847). Six Views of Kot Kangra and the Surrounding Country. Sketches on the Spot. London: Smith, Elder & Co. [6 plates].

Attribution:

Further reading 

 Buckland, C. E. (1906). "Jack, Alexander (1805–1857)". Dictionary of Indian Biography. London: Swan Sonnenschein & Co., Lim. p. 218.
 Kaye, John (1889). Kaye's and Malleson's History of the Indian Mutiny of 1857–8. Malleson, G. B. (ed.). Cabinet Edition. Vol. 2. London: W. H. Allen. pp. 217–268.
 Thomson, Mowbray (1859). The Story of Cawnpore. London: Richard Bentley. pp. 62, 109.

1805 births
1857 deaths
British East India Company Army officers
British military personnel of the First Anglo-Sikh War
British military personnel of the Second Anglo-Sikh War
British military personnel killed in the Indian Rebellion of 1857
People from Aberdeen